Kim Eun-ji (born 10 September 1979), better known as MayBee, is a South Korean singer, lyricist, actress and radio presenter. She hosted KBS Cool FM's Pump Up the Volume radio show from 2006 to 2010.

Personal life
MayBee married actor Yoon Sang-hyun on February 8, 2015. The couple became engaged in November 2014 after eight months of dating.

Discography

Studio albums

Singles

Songwriting credits 
Below is a list of MayBee's lyric-writing credits for songs by other artists. All information is from the Korea Music Copyright Association online database. MayBee's writer ID is W0436200.

Filmography

Television 
 Pink Lipstick – Park Jung Hee

Awards and nominations

References

External links 

1979 births
Living people
South Korean women pop singers
South Korean rhythm and blues singers
South Korean singer-songwriters
South Korean radio presenters
People from Busan
South Korean television actresses
21st-century South Korean singers
21st-century South Korean women singers
South Korean women radio presenters
South Korean women singer-songwriters